Cəyirli or Dzheirli or Dzheiyrli or Dzhagirli or Dzhagyrli or Dzheyirli 
or Dzhayirli or Dzhairli may refer to:
Cəyirli, Barda, Azerbaijan
Cəyirli, Gobustan, Azerbaijan
Cəyirli, Goychay, Azerbaijan
Cəyirli, Hajigabul, Azerbaijan
Cəyirli, Shaki, Azerbaijan
Çayırlı, Azerbaijan
Çəyirli, Azerbaijan

See also
 Çayırlı (disambiguation)